Subconsciously is the sixth studio album by South African DJ and music producer Black Coffee, released on February 5, 2021, by Soulstic Music. Pharrell Williams, David Guetta, Diplo and Usher appear as guest artists.

The album  won the Best Dance/Electronic at the 64th Grammy Awards.

Background 
Black  Coffee began recording the album in the third quarter of 2018.

Title 
The album's title was inspired by "SBCNCSLY", a song which features Sabrina Claudio.

Release and singles 
"Drive" featuring French DJ David Guetta and  Delilah Montagu was released in August 2018, as the album's lead single. The song debuted on the US Billboard Dance/Electronic Songs at number 31.

Subconsciously was released on February 5, 2021.

Commercial performance
The album broke Apple Music and Spotify 2021 records for highest streams, with over 100 million streams.

Critical reception 

Reviewing the album for Pitchfork, Tarisai Ngangura stated, "Subconsciously isn't the type of album that offers bangers through and through, but the standout tracks are compelling enough to stay the course".

Year-end lists

Track listing

Awards 
Subconscioulsy won Dance/Electronic Album at the  64th Grammy Awards.

Personnel 
Subconsciously credits are adapted from AllMusic.
 Ben Abraham - Composer
 Aki - Primary Artist, Vocals
 Maxine Ashley - Composer, Primary Artist, Vocals
 C-Tea - Producer
 Cassie - Primary Artist, Vocals
 Celeste - Composer, Primary Artist, Vocals
 Sabrina Claudio - Composer, Primary Artist, Vocals
 Sasha Cron - Composer
 Ry Cuming - Composer, Vocals
 Kevin Davis - Mixing
 Kevin KD Davis - Mixing, Mixing Engineer
 Diplo - Musical Producer, Primary Artist, Producer
 DJ Angelo - Composer, Musical Producer, Primary Artist
 Jocelyn Donald - Composer
 Elderbrook - Primary Artist, Vocals
 Mikkel Storleer Eriksen - Composer
 Phillip Fender - Composer
 Feli Ferraro - Composer
 Gene Grimaldi - Mastering Engineer
 David Guetta - Composer, Musical Producer, Primary Artist, Producer
 Tor Erik Hermansen - Composer
 Jinadu - Composer, Primary Artist, Producer, Vocals
 Shawn Joseph - Mastering Engineer
 Jozzy - Primary Artist, Vocals
 Ilsey Juber - Composer
 King Henry - Producer
 Alexander Kotz - Composer
 Kwes. - Producer
 Lucky Daye - Composer
 Michaël Malih - Composer, Producer
 Nkosinathi Maphumulo - Composer, Electronic Percussion, Musical Producer, Primary Artist, Producer  
 Chris McClenney - Composer
 Delilah Montagu - Primary Artist, Vocals
 Asanda Mvana - Composer
 Thelumusa Owen - Composer
 Una Rams - Composer, Musical Producer, Primary Artist, Producer
 Usher Raymond IV - Composer
 RY X - Primary Artist
 Lisa Scinta - Composer
 Shapiro - Composer
 Ben Shapiro - Composer
 India Shawn - Composer
 Stargate - Producer
 Sanele Sithole - Primary Artist, Vocals, Composer, Producer
 Tellaman - Primary Artist, Vocals
 Usher - Primary Artist, Vocals
 Casandra Ventura - Composer
 Ralph Wegner - Composer, Producer
 Philippe Weiss - Mixing
 Pharrell Williams - Composer, Primary Artist, Vocals

Release history

References

2021 albums
Grammy Award for Best Dance/Electronica Album